Stefan Strelcyn (28 June 1918 - 19 May 1981) was a Polish scholar of Ethiopian Studies and a Semitist.

Life

Stefan Strelcyn was born at Warsaw on 1918. In Warsaw he attended the Gimnazjum Ascola and the Technical Engineering School. In 1938 he left Poland and went to Belgium where he devoted himself to oriental archaeology and philology in the Université Libre de Bruxelles. In 1945 he studied classical Ethiopic and Amharic at the Sorbonne, the École nationale des langues orientales vivantes and the École pratique des hautes études. He was a student of Marcel Cohen. In 1950 he was expelled from France to Poland, where he became an Associate Professor of Semitic Studies. In 1954 he became a full professor. In 1967 he was awarded the Haile Selassie Prize for Ethiopian studies.

In 1981 he died in Manchester.

Works

 1950: Sur une priere 'Falacha' publiée par C. Conti Rossini :  dans les ’Appunti di storia e letteratura Falascia’. Roma: Piox.
 1951: Un magicien grec en Éthiopie. Paris: Imprimerie nationale.
 1954: Catalogue des manuscrits éthiopiens (Collection Griaule). Paris: Bibliothèque nationale.
 1955: Prières magiques éthiopiennes pour délier les charmes (maftəḥe šərāy). Warsaw: P.W.N.
 1956: La literature religieuse Falacha (état de la question). Bologna : N. Zanichelli.
 1973: Médecine et plantes d'Éthiopie. Napoli : Istituto Universitario orientale.
 1981: "Les mystères des Psaumes, traité éthiopien sur l'emploi des Psaumes (amharique ancien)", in: Bulletin of the School of Oriental and African Studies 44/1, pp. 54–84.

References

 Tubiana, Joseph (1982). "Stefan Strelcyn F.B.A. (1918-1981)", in: Journal of Semitic Studies 27/1, pp. 1–15.
 Ullendorff, Edward (1981). "Stefan Strelcyn (1918-1981)", in: The British Academy, Proceedings, Vol. LXVII, London [= E. Ullendorff, Studia Aethiopica et Semitica (Stuttgart: Franz Steiner 1987), pp. 289–300]

Footnotes

1918 births
1981 deaths
Semiticists
Ethiopianists
Polish orientalists
Fellows of the British Academy
Polish Africanists
Polish emigrants to France
Polish expatriates in Belgium